Aleš Mušič (born June 28, 1982) is a Slovenian professional ice hockey winger for Fehérvár AV19.

Mušič competed in several IIHF World Championships as a member of the Slovenia men's national ice hockey team.

Career statistics

Regular season and playoffs

International

References

External links
 

1982 births
Living people
HDD Olimpija Ljubljana players
Ice hockey players at the 2014 Winter Olympics
Olympic ice hockey players of Slovenia
Slovenian ice hockey left wingers
Sportspeople from Ljubljana
Slovenian expatriate sportspeople in Hungary
Ice hockey players at the 2018 Winter Olympics
HK Olimpija players
Fehérvár AV19 players
Slovenian expatriate ice hockey people
Expatriate ice hockey players in Hungary